The Cattaraugus County Fairgrounds is a multi-purpose venue based in the village of Little Valley, New York, USA. Constructed in 1931, the fairgrounds serve as the site of the Cattaraugus County Fair each August.

Uses

Livestock showing
The fairgrounds have two cow barns, a milking barn three horse stables, a horse exhibition arena, venues for exhibiting pigs, sheep, goats and poultry, and a domestics barn. The horse arena is used for shows throughout the summer. A Grange Hall was located on the premises before being replaced by more modern steel structures in the early 21st century.

Oval racing
From 1997 to 2017, the fairgrounds were used as Little Valley Speedway.

The speedway promoted itself as the only half-mile dirt track in the region and is built as an originally unbanked oval track. Adjacent to the track is a 3,000 seat grandstand (the third-largest sporting venue in Cattaraugus County, behind 4,000 seat Bradner Stadium and 5,780 seat Reilly Center) with ample standing room, in front of which is a wider dirt patch (slightly larger than an American football field) to use for other motor sports, such as truck pulls. The track was configured in its current form in 1997. A 2012 renovation to the speedway partially replaced the dirt patch with an asphalt surface, banked the tracks, added fresh clay to the track and added additional bench seating in front of the grandstand to accommodate large, sometimes overflowing, crowds.

Predominant classes of dirt track racing include late models, super late models, super stocks, street stocks, sprint cars and modified cars (most commonly "E-Mod" class, but also 358 modified). Organizations who have raced at Little Valley Speedway on their circuits include the Bicknell Racing Products Can-Am Series, the United Late Model Series, the American Sprint Car Series Patriot Sprints, the National Dirt Racing League Northeast Circuit, and the Empire Super Sprints. The World of Outlaws Late Model Series held races at the track in 2012 and 2013.

The number of events held at the race track declined beginning in the late 2000s; at its mid-2000s peak, seven or eight events would be held between Memorial Day and late September. Fewer races would be scheduled each year, and rainouts were increasingly used to cancel dates that were scheduled. The track suspended operations for the 2018 season and possibly beyond, with ownership blaming declining interest from racers, falling attendance, and competition from other tracks in the region making it difficult to find available dates that would not conflict with other tracks. By summer 2018, a portion of the track had been paved with asphalt; the remainder had begun to grow over with grass.

Other events

In addition to the racing events, four demolition derbies are held at the track each year. The first is held every July 4 as part of the annual "Freedom Daze" celebration; the three others are during the Cattaraugus County Fair in early August. The last of these is labeled the "Western New York Championship" and determines who represents the county in the Great New York State Fair derby. One of the derbies features a school bus class, which is also paired with a short figure 8 race; these were discontinued after the 2009 fair but returned in 2013. Tractor pulling is a regular feature at the fairgrounds, with larger trucks using the main asphalt surface and tractors using the infield.

The track also holds concerts, typically one or two country music acts during each county fair. Relay for Life established an event at the grounds in 2016.

References

External links
Cattaraugus County Fair

Motorsport venues in New York (state)
Sports venues in Cattaraugus County, New York
1932 establishments in New York (state)
Sports venues completed in 1932